São Tomé (Portuguese for Saint Thomas) may refer to the following places:

Brazil:
São Tomé, Paraná
São Tomé, Rio Grande do Norte
São Thomé das Letras, a touristic town in Minas Gerais
India:
Chennai, known as São Tomé when under Portuguese control
Portugal:
São Tomé de Abação, a parish in the municipality of Guimarães
São Tomé and Príncipe:
São Tomé, capital city of São Tomé and Príncipe
São Tomé Island, an island in São Tomé and Príncipe